Martin Ward (born June 5, 1989) is a former Marshall University running back.

College career

After redshirting in the 2008 season, Ward saw limited action in 2009 until starting running back Darius Marshall was injured late in the season. He made the most of two late season starts, finishing with 393 yards rushing and three touchdowns on the year. 

Despite sharing Bowl game carries with Marshall, Ward earned MVP honors in the Little Caesars Pizza Bowl win over Ohio by rushing for 75 yards and two touchdowns on only 10 carries in a 21-17 Thundering Herd victory. In 2010, Ward played in 10 games with 96 carries for 345 yards and a touchdown, including a 101-yard performance versus West Virginia University. 

In 2011 and 2012, he saw mostly special teams service behind running backs Tron Martinez and Travon Van.

Post college

After playing briefly in the Canadian Football League and Arena Football League, Ward is pursuing his master's degree in Education and mentoring youth. He assists former Marshall offensive lineman Luke Salmons working with the football program at Cabell Midland High School in Ona, West Virginia.

References
 Herd Zone bio from Marshall University Athletics/
 Marshall Wins Little Caesars Pizza Bowl (Conference USA)

1989 births
Living people
American football running backs
Marshall Thundering Herd football players